Gordon W. Wells (December 6, 1917 – November 28, 1999) was an American politician. He served as a Democratic member for the 1st district of the Florida House of Representatives.

Life and career 
Wells was born in Savannah, Georgia. He attended Milton High School, the University of Florida, Bowling Green College of Commerce and the University of Miami.

In 1962, Wells was elected to the Florida House of Representatives. In 1967, he was elected as the first representative for the newly-established 1st district. He served until 1968, when he was succeeded by Roy L. Hess.

Wells died in November 1999, at the age of 81.

References 

1917 births
1999 deaths
Politicians from Savannah, Georgia
Democratic Party members of the Florida House of Representatives
20th-century American politicians
University of Florida alumni
University of Miami alumni